Maqsudabad (also Romanized as Maqşūdābād) is a village in Mohammadabad Rural District, in the Central District of Marvdasht County, Fars Province, Iran. At the 2006 census, its population was 474, in 112 families.

References 

Populated places in Marvdasht County